David Regullano is a former Filipino basketball player. He played for San Miguel in the Manila Industrial and Commercial Athletic Association. Regullano also appeared at the 1973 ABC Championship and 1974 FIBA World Championship as a member of the country's national basketball team.  In the Philippine Basketball Association, he again suited up for his San Miguel team, then carrying the name Royal Tru-Orange, and later, with the U/tex Wranglers, where he won a championship in 1980 after beating the fabled Toyota Tamaraws in the Open Conference championship.  

Regullano was well-known among basketball fans for wearing old-school black high-top Chuck Taylors during games instead of the leather basketball sneakers that became popular in the 70's and 80's.

References

External links
archive.fiba.com - 1974 World Championship for Men - PHI: David Regullano

Living people
Philippines men's national basketball team players
Filipino men's basketball players
1974 FIBA World Championship players
U/Tex Wranglers players
San Miguel Beermen players
Year of birth missing (living people)
Letran Knights basketball players